Instant Karma: The Amnesty International Campaign to Save Darfur is a compilation album of various artists covering songs of John Lennon to benefit Amnesty International's campaign to alleviate the crisis in Darfur.  The album and campaign is part of Amnesty International's global "Make Some Noise" project.

Release
Lennon's songs and music publishing royalties were donated to Amnesty International by Yoko Ono.  Amnesty International used the songs to start the "Make Some Noise" project, which later led to the subsidiary campaign "Instant Karma".  Eventually, enough momentum was achieved through the project to amount to an album.

Ono said: "It's wonderful that, through this campaign, music that is so familiar to many people of my era will now be embraced by a whole new generation. John's music set out to inspire change, and in standing up for human rights, and selling more records, we really can make the world a better place."

Larry Cox, executive director of Amnesty International USA, added: "We know music's power to unite and inspire people. With hundreds of thousands dead, millions driven from their burned out villages and rape being used as a tactic in the Darfur conflict, the world needs a mass mobilization demanding action and justice. The 'Instant Karma' campaign combines John Lennon's passionate desire for us to imagine a more peaceful world with Amnesty International's expertise in achieving justice. 'Instant Karma' allows ordinary people to lend their hand in saving lives – a notion we think would make John proud."

"John Lennon was not just a famous Beatle, he was the social conscience of his generation," says Jeff Ayeroff, one of the album's executive producers. "By reinterpreting his music and reintroducing it to a new generation, we shine a light on the darkness that is Darfur. Yoko Ono's gift of John's music to Amnesty International, whose work points out the pain and injustice in the world, is a true beacon of light. Give peace a chance is all we are saying."

Proceeds from CD and digital sales will support Amnesty International and its campaign to focus attention and mobilize activism around the urgent catastrophe in Darfur, and other human rights crises. It was released in the US on June 12 and the UK on June 25, 2007.

The digital version of the album made it to number 1 on iTunes in Portugal, Ireland, Greece, Denmark and Luxembourg. The physical album made it to number 1 in Ireland and Mexico. As of July 13, 2007 it had certified Gold Status in Italy and Ireland. As of July 11, 2007, the album had sold 107,689 copies in the US.

Track listings

US release

There were two CD versions released in the United States.  The primary version was a two-disc set containing 23 tracks.  The second version was a two-disc set sold only at Borders retail outlets that was identical to the primary version save that disc 2 contained an additional two bonus tracks.

There was an iTunes-only expanded digital release in the United States that added 11 further tracks to the 23 tracks on the primary CD release – making for a 34-track digital set.

Disc one

Disc two

Borders exclusive bonus tracks
(Only available on the special edition of the album courtesy of Borders on Disc Two)

iTunes bonus tracks
(Only available for download on the expanded iTunes edition of the album)

All songs written by Lennon except "Imagine", "Oh, My Love" and "Happy Xmas (War Is Over)" written by Lennon–Ono

International release (outside the United States)

The CD version released outside the United States was a two-disc set containing 28 tracks.

Disc one

Disc two

Instant Karma: The Amnesty International Campaign to Save Darfur (The Complete Recordings)
On October 8, 2007, iTunes released a collection of 61 recordings, including 23 previously unreleased tracks contributed to the project.

Notwithstanding the title The Complete Recordings there were some other tracks prepared for the project that were not included on this digital release. (See below).

This is the listing of the 61 tracks that comprise the iTunes digital release The Complete Recordings:

Nobody Told Me – Abdel Wright
Give Peace a Chance – Aerosmith featuring Sierra Leone's Refugee All Stars
Imagine – Afroreggae
No. 9 Dream – a-ha
Happy Xmas (War Is Over) – Angelique Kidlo with Naima
Love – Audrey de Montigny
Imagine – Avril Lavigne
Oh Yoko – Barenaked Ladies
Beautiful Boy – Ben Harper
Woman – Ben Jelen
Nobody Told Me – Big & Rich
Power to the People – Black Eyed Peas
Mother – Christina Aguilera featuring Bigelf
I'm Losing You – Corinne Bailey Rae
Watching the Wheels – David Usher
Jealous Guy – Deftones
Power to the People – Dj Emjay & The Atari Babies
Hold On – DobaCaracol
Instant Karma – Duran Duran
Oh My Love – Elvira Nikolaisen
Mother – Emmanuel Jal
Mind Games – Eskimo Joe
I Don't Want to Face It – The Fab Faux
Look At Me – Finger Eleven
(Just Like) Starting Over – The Flaming Lips
Beautiful Boy – Freshly Ground
Mind Games – Gavin Rossdale
Working Class Hero – Green Day
Imagine – Jack Johnson
God – Jack's Mannequin featuring Mick Fleetwood
Oh, My Love – Jackson Browne
Gimme Some Truth – Jaguares
Gimme Some Truth (Spanish) – Jaguares
Gimme Some Truth – Jakob Dylan featuring Dhani Harrison
Imagine – James Stewart
Bless You – Leeroy
Cold Turkey – Lenny Kravitz
Whatever Gets You Thru the Night (Peu Importe Si tu Passe la Nuit) – Les Trois Accords
Whatever Gets You Thru the Night – Los Lonely Boys
I'm Losing You – Madrugada
Watching the Wheels – Matisyahu
Imagine – Me'Shell Ndegeocello
Borrowed Time – O.A.R.
Woman – Paddy Casey
Grow Old With Me – The Postal Service
Real Love – Regina Spektor
No.9 Dream – R.E.M.
Well Well Well – Rocky Dawuni
Isolation – Snow Patrol
Love – The Cure
One Day at a Time – The Raveonettes
Instant Karma – The Waking Eyes
Working Class Hero – Tina Dickow
Instant Karma – Tokio Hotel
John Sinclair – Trevor Menear
Instant Karma – U2
Give Peace a Chance – The Voices of Asia
Crippled Inside – Widespread Panic
Imagine – Willie Nelson
Oh, My Love – Yellowcard
Jealous Guy – Youssou N'Dour

Unreleased recordings
The Instant Karma project and the Make Some Noise initiative that preceded it stimulated a desire by many artists to contribute recordings. In addition to the 61 tracks released through the various CD and digital configurations of Instant Karma there were 8 tracks created for the project that did not get included in any format.  One track was released subsequently by Amnesty as a separate high-profile project. (Detailed below). These are the 7 tracks created for the Instant Karma project that have not to date been released by Amnesty:

 Mind Games – MIA.
 Give Peace a Chance – Puppetmastaz featuring Angie Reed
 Imagine – Josh Groban 
 Jealous Guy – K-OS 
 Working Class Hero – Racoon  
 Instant Karma! – The Sheer
 Happy Xmas (War Is Over) – Maroon 5

Ozzy Osbourne tribute to Lennon
In 2007, Ozzy Osbourne recorded a version of "How?" specially for the Instant Karma produced by Mark Hudson. For reasons never publicly disclosed the recording was not incorporated in any of the released versions of the album.

In 2010, Osbourne was working on an unrelated TV project with longtime Amnesty producer Martin Lewis, who three decades earlier had instigated Amnesty's outreach to rock musicians by recruiting and producing Pete Townshend, Sting, Eric Clapton, Jeff Beck, Bob Geldof and others for Amnesty.

Lewis encouraged Osbourne to re-purpose his unused Lennon recording for a new project saluting Lennon. Osbourne agreed to donate his track for a special iTunes charity single benefiting Amnesty to be released in October 2010 in conjunction with multiple celebrations of the 70th anniversary of Lennon's birth including an all-star concert for Amnesty in New York City.

Osbourne then made a special music video shot in Manhattan paying his very personal tribute to Lennon, produced by Lewis and directed by filmmaker Ernie Fritz.

The charity release was blessed by Yoko Ono who stated "John's spirit and influence is stronger than ever. John shared a common purpose with Amnesty International - shining a light on wrongs and campaigning to protect people's rights.  We all shine on!"

References

External links

Amnesty International
John Lennon tribute albums
Albums produced by David Kahne
Albums produced by Marti Frederiksen
Albums produced by Jacknife Lee
Albums produced by will.i.am
Albums produced by Linda Perry
Charity albums
2007 compilation albums
Warner Records compilation albums
Rock compilation albums
Pop compilation albums